Nacchar, also known as Nakkar, was a Tamil poet, scholar, and commentator known for his commentary on the Thirukkural. He was among the canon of ten medieval commentators of the Kural text most highly esteemed by modern scholars. However, his work has been lost along with other four ancient commentators, namely, Dhamatthar, Dharumar, Thirumalaiyar, and Mallar.

Biography
Nacchar is often incorrectly believed by some as Nachinarkiniyar, another medieval Tamil poet. However, several scholars deny this, citing that an ancient verse praising the poet Nachinarkiniyar does not mention that he has written commentary on the Tirukkural. Moreover, Nachinarkiniyar lived in the 14th century, about three centuries later than Nacchar. Scholars also opine that the similarity between the two names lead to this incorrect conclusion by some.

See also

 Ten Medieval Commentators
 Bhashya
 Commentaries in Tamil literary tradition

References

Further reading
 M. Arunachalam (2005). Tamil Ilakkiya Varalaru, Padhinaindhaam Nootraandu [History of Tamil Literature, 15th century].
 
 D. M. Vellaivaaranam (1983). Tirukkural Uraikotthu. Thiruppananthal Shri Kasimadam Publications.

Tirukkural
Tamil poets
Tirukkural commentators
Ten medieval commentators
Medieval Tamil poets
Tamil-language writers
Tamil scholars
Scholars from Tamil Nadu
11th-century Indian scholars